The Boston Crusaders Drum and Bugle Corps is a competitive junior drum and bugle corps.  Based in Boston, Massachusetts, the Boston Crusaders are a charter member of Drum Corps International.

History
The Boston Crusaders were founded in 1940 as the Most Precious Blood Crusaders, a youth activity of the Most Precious Blood Catholic parish in the Hyde Park section of Boston.  The Corps and the parish parted ways in 1956, and the corps took a new name, the Hyde Park Crusaders.  During this period, two ardent, if unofficial supporters of the corps were two of the Kennedy brothers, John F. and Edward M. "Ted". Although John is often credited, Ted was responsible for acquiring West Point uniforms that the Crusaders converted to their own colors. The corps was honored by the newly elected President Kennedy by being invited to be the first drum and bugle corps to march in a Presidential Inauguration Parade. The corps' tight financial situation prevented their attendance in 1961, but the corps marched in President  Lyndon B. Johnson's  Inauguration Parade in 1964. JFK  was formally made an honorary member of the corps only 34 days before his assassination.

By 1959, the corps had become the Boston Crusaders, although they often were (and still are) referred to as "BAC" or the Boston Area Crusaders, and BAC was one of the East Coast powerhouse corps of the 1960s.  They won the first CYO National Drum and Bugle Championship in 1964 and repeated as CYO champions in 1967 & '68.  In 1966 and again in 1967 the Boston Crusaders were crowned World Open (class A) Champions. The corps was a finalist at VFW Nationals in 1969 & '70 and would have won the 1967 American Legion Junior Championship, if the powers-that-be had not voided the scores for the corps' inspection, allowing the Cavaliers to outscore them.

In 1971, the Boston Crusaders, along with the 27th Lancers, Blessed Sacrament Golden Knights, Blue Rock, and Garfield Cadets formed the United Organization of Junior Corps (also known as the "Alliance").  This action was taken in reaction to the rigid, inflexible rules of the American Legion and VFW (the primary rule makers and sponsors of both corps and shows) and the low or nonexistent performance fees paid for appearing in the various competitions. The corps felt that not only were they having their creative potential as artistic performing groups stifled, but they were being financially starved. (A similar group of Midwestern corps, the Midwest Combine, was formed by the Blue Stars, Cavaliers, Madison Scouts, Santa Clara Vanguard, and the Troopers.) The Alliance members felt that the corps should be making their own rules, operating their own competitions and championships, and keeping the bulk of the monies those shows earned. For the 1971 season, the corps stuck together, offering show promoters the five corps as a package. Despite pressure on show sponsors, judges, and other drum corps, the corps were booked into a number of shows together.

In 1972, the Boston Crusaders, along with the nine other corps from the Alliance and the Midwest Combine, plus the Anaheim Kingsmen, Argonne Rebels, and De La Salle Oaklands were founding members of Drum Corps International, which remains as the sanctioning body for junior corps in North America.  That summer, there was a fire in the corps hall that destroyed much of the corps' equipment.  The corps was forced to withdraw from many of its scheduled contests, and at one point, could claim only nineteen active members. Rather than attending the first DCI World Championship in Whitewater, Wisconsin, BAC returned to the field to compete at CYO Nationals, where they finished ninth of thirteen corps and solidified their reputation as, "the corps that would not die."

Disaster struck again a decade later when, while on a 1982 tour in the United Kingdom, the corps' funds were embezzled, leaving members and staff stranded and financially insolvent in England. The Corps made it back home with the assistance of the US State Department for members under the age of 18, and all others paid their own way or received assistance from a handful of very generous supporters. The airline involved filed a receivership action, and several alumni stepped in to negotiate the release of title to the Corps' assets. Once more, the corps refused to die, fielding a small unit in 1983 as the Boston Drum and Bugle Corps. The instructional staff produced a first-class program, working tirelessly without compensation. During that year, the Corps marched in every parade possible within a day's drive of Boston, and repaid all of the Corps' debts, with the exception of the airline, which was never pursued. Three years later, the Corps resumed the use of the Boston Crusaders name.

Through the years, BAC had fostered a well-earned image of toughness.  Prior to DCI Prelims in Miami in 1983, a gang of street thugs was harassing corps as they prepared to enter the Orange Bowl Stadium.  The Boston Crusaders, "...as adept with fists as with bugles..." solved the problem by chasing the gang away.  However, this attitude was not conducive to attracting sufficient numbers of talented members to be a truly competitive corps, and in combination with a reputation for being troublemakers, the corps was relegated to middling rankings within DCI through the 1980s and '90's.

Under corps director Jim Cronin from 1996 to 2000, the corps adopted a new philosophy of "professionalism, accountability, and responsibility" for its members.  In 1999, the Boston Crusaders finally earned a place among DCI's Top Twelve Finalists.  They have returned to Finals in every year since, placing as high as fifth in 2000 & 2002 & 2018.

Historically, the Boston Crusaders have often been drum corps innovators.  They were the first corps to march double tenor drums in 1967; the first to march tympani in 1968 (as the Majestic Knights of nearby Charlestown also did); the first with slides on their horns to allow playing a chromatic scale; and, although they were penalized for it in every show, the first to use a synthesizer in 1985.

On January 21, 2013, the corps marched in President Barack Obama's second inauguration parade.

The Boston Crusaders experienced one of its most competitive and successful seasons in the summer of 2018. The corps finished in 5th place at the 2018 Drum Corps International World Championships, with the color guard winning the George Zingali caption award for Best Guard--- the first time the Boston corps had ever won a caption at the world championships. This was followed in 2019 by a 6th place finish, despite an improved score, and a second successive Zingali Award. In 2022, Boston received their thrird Zingali and finished 2nd place tying with the Bluecoats Drum and Bugle Corps.

Alumni corps 
The Crusaders Senior Drum and Bugle Corps of Boston was founded in 1991 as the alumni corps of the Boston Crusaders. It was founded by twin brothers Neil and Terry Connolly, both alumni of the Boston Crusaders. The first Senior Crusader performance took place in 1992, at the Patriots' Day Parade in Medford, Massachusetts.

The first home for the “Saders” (now officially renamed the Crusaders Senior Drum and Bugle Corps of Boston) was at the City Hall in Waltham, Massachusetts, though, over the years, the corps has had numerous practice facilities in the greater Boston area. The corps now calls the Lt. Norman Prince VFW Post (also known as Prince Palace) in Melrose, Massachusetts its home.

Show summary (1972–2022) 
Source:

Caption awards 
At the annual World Championship Finals, Drum Corps International (DCI) presents awards to the corps with the highest average scores from prelims, semifinals, and finals in five captions. The Boston Crusaders have won these caption awards: 

George Zingali Best Color Guard Award

 2018, 2019, 2022

Traditions

"Conquest"
The Boston Crusaders first performed Alfred Newman's "Conquest" from the 1947 swashbuckling motion picture, Captain from Castile, in 1969 and repeated it in 1970. The corps brought the tune back in 1973 and 1974, then performed it as a part of their show every year from 1976 through 1990. Since then, "Conquest" had become a signature piece for the Crusaders.

Waldo
The Boston Crusader's symbol is King Richard's split-tailed lion. Affectionately known as "Waldo", the lion can be seen on all of the corps' vehicles, on the corps members' jackets, on corps merchandise, and as tattoos on many members and alumni of the Crusaders.

"Giant"
The Crusaders' corps song "Giant" is based on the main theme from the 1956 movie, Giant.

References

External links
Official website

Drum Corps International World Class corps
Culture of Boston
Musical groups from Boston
Musical groups established in 1940
1940 establishments in Massachusetts